YJV is the first extended play and third overall release by Filipino artist Young JV, released on June 15, 2015, under Star Records.

The EP re-featured the Hurts So Bad part of his second effort in 2012.

Track listing

Single
"Ale" was the first released single from the album. It managed to enter Pinoy Myx Countdown but peaked not higher than 19 spot.

"Flashback" is the second single from the album, released on October 22, 2015. It was launched on MOR 99.1 radio station and its music video is premiered on Myx Philippines on the 23rd.

References

2015 EPs
Young JV albums